The Australian cricket team toured the West Indies in the 1954–55 season to play a five-match Test series against the West Indies. Australia won the series 3–0 and were extremely popular tourists.

Australian squad
The original squad selected were as follows:
Batsmen – Colin McDonald, Neil Harvey, Peter Burge, Arthur Morris, Les Favell, Bill Watson
Fast bowlers – Ray Lindwall, Alan Davidson, Bill Johnston
Spinners – Ian Johnson (captain), Jack Hill
All rounders – Richie Benaud, Keith Miller, Ron Archer
Wicketkeepers – Gil Langley, Len Maddocks

Test series summary

First Test

Second Test

Third Test

Fourth Test

The Australian first innings total of 668 at Bridgetown is still the highest Test match innings that does not feature an individual score of 150.

Fifth Test

CL Walcott sets a record for the highest aggregate of runs in a Test series (827) without scoring a double-century.

References

External links
Australians in West Indies 1954–55 at Cricinfo
Australians in West Indies 1954–55 at CricketArchive

1955 in Australian cricket
1954-55
West Indian cricket seasons from 1945–46 to 1969–70
International cricket competitions from 1945–46 to 1960
1955 in West Indian cricket